Fritz Ludvig von Dardel (24 March 1817 – 27 May 1901) was a Swedish diarist, illustrator and early comics artist. He was a courtier, and is known for his diary and illustrations depicting the life of the Swedish court in the mid-19th century.

Biography

Fritz von Dardel was born in Neuchâtel to the Swiss noble Georges-Alexandre von Dardel, who was inducted into the Swedish nobility in 1810, and the Swedish noble Hedvig Sofia Charlotta Amalia Lewenhaupt, and married the Swedish noble Augusta Silfverschiöld. He became adjutant to the Crown Prince, later King Charles XV of Sweden, in 1850.

He was a personal friend of Charles XV aside from having several court offices, and both professionally and privately he often attended court during the reign of Charles, and his published diary is a valuable description of the Swedish court and its personages in the mid 19th-century.

von Dardel was military attaché in Paris from 1852 to 1862 and became chamberlain of Charles XV's cabinet in 1864. He was also chairman of the Nationalmuseum's board from 1867 to 1892.

At several art exhibitions in Europe (1867, 1871, 1873 and 1878) as well as in Philadelphia (1876), von Dardel was the juryman, and he himself had studied studies at Léon Cogniets and E. Lami's studios in Paris.

Fritz von Dardel is known for his drawings and diary depicting the life at the contemporary Swedish royal court, especially during the reign of Charles XV.

He became a member of the Royal Swedish Academy of Arts in 1861.

Comics
Many of von Dardel's caricatures were made in series in order to tell a (comic) story together with short accompanying texts. They were early examples of cartoon series, probably inspired by his Swiss compatriot Rodolphe Töpffer. His works are represented in the Stockholm City Museum, Kalmar Art Museum, and Nationalmuseum.

Gallery

Bibliography
Teckningar ur dagens händelser : serie A - F.. Sthlm & Göteborg. 1848-1852.
Ett besök i Malmö läger. Malmö. 1848.
Gubben med skåpet : scener ur svenska hvardagslifvet. [Stockholm]. 1849.
Familjen Tutings lustresa till Bomarsund. [Stockholm]. 1853. 
En familj från landet på besök i hufvudstaden. [Stockholm]. 1856. 
Svenska och norska [arméen] armeerna samt flottorna i [dess] deras nuvarande uniformering. Stockholm. 1861-1863. 
Ett besök i Nationalmuseum. Aftryck ur Post- och inrikes tidningar. Stockholm. 1865.
International Exhibition of 1871 (1872). Internationela utställningen i London 1871. 1, Konst och konst-industri : redogörelse. Stockholm: Norstedt. 
Dagblads-annonser. Stockholm. 1875. 
Marionetter : pennritningar. [Stockholm]. 1876.
Åtgärder vidtagna i några af Europas länder för konstindustriens befrämjande : reseberättelse. Stockholm: Centraltryckeriet. 1878.
Minnen. Stockholm: Norstedt. 1911-1913. 
Del 1, 1833-1861. 1911. 
Del 2, 1863-1865. 1912. 
Del 3, 1866-1870. 1912. 
Del 4, 1871-1872 ; Jämte personregister till delarna 1-4. 1913. 
Dagboksanteckningar. Stockholm: Norstedt. 1916-1920.
[1], 1873-1876. 1916.
[2], 1877-1880. 1918. 
[3], 1881-1885. 1920. 
Minnen från senare år, 1888-1898. Stockholm: Norstedt. 1931. 
Ur Fritz von Dardels album : bilder ur sällskaps- och militärlifvet från adertonhundratalets midt. Stockholm: Norstedt. 1915.
Färg och form, Malmtorgsgatan 10, november 1940 : minnesutställning Fritz von Dardel (1817-1901). Katalog [107]. Stockholm. 1940. 
När var tar sin. Stockholm: Carlsson. 1988. 
Herrar Black & Smith på väg till Skandinavien. Stockholm: Carlsson. 1991. 
Fritz von Dardels Gubben med skåpet : en svensk serieklassiker från 1849 ; [with English text]. Magister Lämpels bibliotek, 99-2988643-5. Malmö: Seriefrämjandet. 2003.

References

 Nordisk familjebok / Uggleupplagan. 5. Cestius - Degas

1817 births
1901 deaths
Members of the Royal Swedish Academy of Arts
19th-century Swedish artists
Swedish illustrators
Swedish comics artists
Swedish civil servants
Swedish Army colonels
Swedish military attachés
Fritz
19th-century Swedish military personnel
19th-century Swedish writers
Swedish diarists
19th-century diarists
Burials at Norra begravningsplatsen